The black-footed mongoose (Bdeogale nigripes) is a mongoose species native to Central Africa, where it inhabits deep deciduous forests from eastern Nigeria to the southern Democratic Republic of the Congo. It has been listed as Least Concern on the IUCN Red List since 2008.
It is omnivorous and feeds on ants, termites, Orthoptera, small rodents, frogs, lizards and fruits.
It is mostly solitary and nocturnal.

Results of genetic and morphological analyses indicate that the black-footed mongoose is closely related to Jackson's mongoose, which is considered conspecific.

References

black-footed mongoose
Mammals of Cameroon
Mammals of Equatorial Guinea
Mammals of the Democratic Republic of the Congo
Mammals of Gabon
Fauna of Central Africa
black-footed mongoose